Aclophoropsis is a genus of minute sea snails with left-handed shell-coiling, marine gastropod mollusks or micromollusks in the family Triphoridae.

Description
These small snails have left-handed shells (adult size from 6 – 12 mm) with very high spires.

Distribution
These small sea snails are found in Australia (Victoria, New South Wales),  Tasmania, and French Polynesia

Species
Species within the genus Aclphoropsis are as follows:
 Aclophoropsis festiva (A. Adams, 1851)
 Aclophoropsis maculosa (Hedley, 1903)
 Aclophoropsis univitta (Laseron, 1954)
 Aclophoropsis mcmichaeli (Kosuge, 1962)

References

External links
 Marshall B.A. (1983) A revision of the Recent Triphoridae of southern Australia. Records of the Australian Museum supplement 2: 1-119

Triphoridae